Jiří Krystan (born 31 January 1990) is a Czech footballer currently playing for FK Dobrovice. He plays as a midfielder.

References

External links
 Guardian Football
 

1990 births
Living people
Czech footballers
Czech First League players
FC Slovan Liberec players
FK Bohemians Prague (Střížkov) players
Association football midfielders